Mungen may refer to:

 Mungen, Ohio, unincorporated community in Ohio (USA)
 William Mungen (1821–1887), nineteenth-century American politician, lawyer, teacher, editor and publisher from Ohio